Fatos Lubonja (born 1951) is an Albanian writer and dissident.

Life 
Fatos is the son of Todi Lubonja, who was a close associate of Communist leader of Albania  Enver Hoxha and head of Albanian national television until the early 1970s. In the course of Hoxha's split with the USSR in 1960, Todi Lubonja was arrested for voicing opposition. Fatos, who had been studying physics in Tirana, was also arrested due to the discovery of his diary, which was critical of Hoxha.

Fatos Lubonja was initially sentenced to seven years' imprisonment. He was later accused of belonging to a pro-Soviet circle in the prison and was sentenced to 20 more years. After having spent 13 years at hard labor, he was moved to solitary confinement. There he wrote a diary. Fatos Lubonja was released in 1991, after having spent 17 years in prison and having suffered a nervous breakdown while serving his sentence. 

He is an outspoken critic of Albanian socio-political factors, i.e. right-wing leader Sali Berisha, Socialist Party leader Edi Rama, former KLA leader Ramush Haradinaj, the Red and Black Alliance, and poet and novelist Ismail Kadare. He edits and publishes a literary magazine Përpjekja (Endeavour) in Tirana, which was founded by him in 1994.

Lubonja received the SEEMO Award for Mutual Cooperation in South East Europe in 2004. His novel The Last Massacre is a take on communism under Hoxha. His book "False Apocalypse" was translated into English and published in London by Istros Books in 2014.

References

External links 
 Përpjekja back issues

Albanian male writers
20th-century Albanian writers
1951 births
Living people
21st-century Albanian writers
Albanian journalists
Albanian publishers (people)
Albanian activists
Albanian novelists
21st-century novelists
Albanian-language writers
Albanian dissidents